Dr. Eugen Pavel is a Romanian scientist and the inventor of the Hyper CD-ROM, a 3D optical data storage medium with an initial capacity of 1PB and with a theoretical capacity of 100 EB on a single disc. It is considered by some to be the next revolution in computer storage.

Dr. Pavel graduated with a physics degree from the University of Bucharest in 1976. He was awarded the Romanian Academy Prize in 1991 and obtained his doctorate in Physics from the Romanian Institute of Atomic Physics in 1992.

He won the "Prix International de l’Organisation Mondiale de la Presse Periodique" and a gold medal at the November 1999 EUREKA Contest in Brussels for inventions that led to the creation of the Hyper CD-ROM. Dr. Pavel has published more than 40 books and articles, and he is the holder of 62 patents and patent applications.
In an interview about his work on the Hyper CD-ROM, Dr. Pavel stated that "the research for this project is 100% personal, (and) so is the support for experiments." (English translation of quote originally published in Romanian)
Dr. Pavel's Hyper CD-ROM technology is patented in 21 countries: the USA, Canada, Japan, Israel and 17 European states.
USA company Constellation 3D  announced on June 7, 2000 a similar optical storage media under the name Fluorescent Multilayer Disc.

References 

Living people
Romanian computer scientists
Romanian scientists
Romanian inventors
Year of birth missing (living people)